Van Damme State Park is a public beach consisting of about  of land in Mendocino County, California, near the town of Little River on State Route 1. It was named for Charles F. Van Damme (1881–1934), who was born in the area and purchased the land that is now the park with profits from a San Francisco ferry business. On his death, the property became part of the California state park system.

Description
The greater part of the park lies on the inland side of State Route 1 and includes ten miles of hiking trails along the Little River and campsites rated by the Guardian as one of the ten best on the West Coast.

On the ocean side of the highway, a free parking lot provides access to Little River Beach at the mouth of the Little River, also part of the park. The waters offshore from the beach form the Van Damme State Marine Conservation Area. The beach also serves as the launch site for kayak tours of the sea caves in the area.

It was purchased by the state in 1996.

Inland, a boardwalked nature trail leads through a pygmy forest, where poor soil has created a marshy ecosystem of stunted cypress and pine trees and rhododendrons. There are two pygmy forested areas within Van Damme State Park. On the north border of the park is a  parcel named in honor of Charlotte M. Hoak.

References

External links 

 Official Van Damme State Park website
 Charlotte M. Hoak Pygmy Forest

State parks of California
Parks in Mendocino County, California
Beaches of Mendocino County, California
Protected areas established in 1934
Beaches of Northern California
1934 establishments in California